Alexander Alexandrovich Yakhontov (Александр Александрович Яхонтов;  in Moscow, Russian Empire — 17 November 1973 in Moscow, U.S.S.R.) was a entomologist who specialized in Lepidoptera.

Jachontov described many new taxa mostly at the subspecies level and wrote biogeographic works notably on the Rhopalocera of the Vladimir and Nizhny Novgorod regions and those of the Caucasus.
He wrote Nashi dnevnye babochki (Our Butterflies) published in Moscow in 1935.

His work appears in 
Revue Russe d’Entomologie, Moscow
Izvestia Moskovskogo entomologicheskogo obstshestva, Moscow
Izvestija Kavkazskogo Museja, Tiflis
Ent., Mater. Pozn. Fauny Flory SSSR

The species Pararge jachontovi Sheljuzhko  was named for him.

1879 births
1973 deaths
Lepidopterists from the Russian Empire
Soviet entomologists
Scientists from Moscow